Balmyshevo is a rural locality (a village) in Vakhromeyevskoye Rural Settlement, Kameshkovsky District, Vladimir Oblast, Russia. The population was 11 as of 2010.

Geography 
Balmyshevo is located on the Seksha River, 13 km north of Kameshkovo (the district's administrative centre) by road. Simakovo is the nearest rural locality.

References 

Rural localities in Kameshkovsky District